Magyarnándor is a village in Nógrád County, Hungary with 1,097 inhabitants (2014).

Populated places in Nógrád County